The Upper Rhine Conference (officially known as the Franco-German-Swiss Conference of the Upper Rhine) provides the institutional framework for cross-border cooperation in the Upper Rhine region. It is the successor organization to the two regional commissions (bipartite regional commission for the northern and tripartite regional commission for the southern Upper Rhine region) which derived from the 1975 Upper Rhine agreement between Germany, France and Switzerland, which were established to work under the auspices of the Franco-German-Swiss Intergovernmental Commission.

Organization and structure 

The committees of the Upper Rhine Conference are:
Steering Committee: the coordinating and decision-making body of the Upper Rhine Conference, consisting of a delegation from each of the three countries; the heads of the delegations take it in turns to assume the presidency of the Upper Rhine Conference for one calendar year at a time. The heads of the delegations are, respectively
for France, the prefect of the region of Alsace
for Germany, (usually) the district president of Freiburg im Breisgau or Karlsruhe or the competent representative of Rhineland-Palatinate
for Switzerland, a Member of the Executive Council of one of the cantons of Basel-Stadt or Basel-Landschaft.
Plenary Assembly: the discussion forum of the Upper Rhine Conference, consisting of one German, one French and one Swiss delegation with a maximum of 25 members each appointed by the heads of the respective delegations (see Steering Committee).
Joint Secretariat: the management body of the Upper Rhine Conference, consisting of one permanent representative (Delegation Secretary) from each of the German, French and Swiss delegations plus one administrative assistant; based in Kehl (Germany) since 1996.
Working groups: Twelve working groups have been established to deal with the cross-border issues that fall within the remit of the Upper Rhine Conference. These consist of experts from the French, German and Swiss partner institutions. Specifically, there are working groups for the following areas: 
Education and vocational training
Public health
Youth programs
Disaster relief
Culture
Regional planning
Environment
Regional transport policy
Economic policy
Agriculture
Sport
Climate and Energy
 
The working groups assign work on specific issues or the implementation of specific projects to expert commissions. There are approx. 35 such expert commissions.

Tripartite Congress 

Ever since 1988 a Tripartite Congress has been held approximately every three years in order to present the results of the cross-border cooperation to a wider public and also to act as an impetus for further work by means of the political decisions (final declarations) taken there. The congresses are organized by each of the three participating countries in rotation.

The 13th Tripartite Congress was organised on June 27, 2012 in Landau under the heading "Rendez-vous régional - Zivilgesellschaft im Dialog mit...".
The 12th Tripartite Congress took place in 2010 in Basel under the heading "Education, Research and innovation". It was organized by the REGIO BASILIENSIS on behalf of the five north-western cantons of Switzerland. 
The 11th Tripartite Congress took place on January 11, 2008 in Strasbourg (France) under the heading "The Upper Rhine: A model for development and cooperation". The main focus was on measures designed to promote the creation of a tripartite European metropolitan region of the Upper Rhine.

To date, the following Tripartite Congresses have taken place (with key topics, venue and year):

Transport and communication, Kehl 1988
Culture and development, Strasbourg 1989
The environment, Basel 1991
The economy, Karlsruhe 1992
Youth, training and employment, Strasbourg 1995
Trades and crafts, Basel 1997
Regional development, Neustadt an der Weinstrasse 1999
Living together within the Upper Rhine area, Strasbourg 2002
Media and communication in the Upper Rhine area, Basel 2004
The future of the Upper Rhine area in an enlarged Europe, Freiburg 2006
The Upper Rhine: a model for development and cooperation, Strasbourg 2008
Education, Research and innovation, Basel 2010
Civil Society, Landau 2012

See also 

Upper Rhine


References

External links 

Upper Rhine Conference  – Official site with information on topics and projects, documentation and diary notes.
Trinational Metropolitan Upper Rhine Region - Official site (in German and French only).

International organizations based in Europe
Upper Rhine